Monarch Stadium is a 6,000-seat multipurpose stadium in Valley Glen, California on the campus of Los Angeles Valley College.  It was built in 1951, and has always been the home of the college's Monarchs football, soccer and track and field teams.  Grant High School, which is adjacent to Valley College, also plays its home football and soccer games here.  It also hosts its track meetings at the stadium though that activity has been curtailed since the school dropped its track and field program.

The stadium was remodeled in 2006 and also hosts other sporting events and community events.  Scenes from the Clueless episode "Homecoming Queen" were filmed here.

External links
Monarch Stadium at lavc.edu
Monarch Stadium at lasports.org

College football venues
Sports venues in Greater Los Angeles
American football venues in Los Angeles
High school football venues in California
1951 establishments in California
Sports venues completed in 1951
College track and field venues in the United States
Athletics (track and field) venues in California
Los Angeles Valley College
College soccer venues in California